Richard "Richi" Freitag (born 14 August 1991) is a German former ski jumper who competed at World Cup level from 2010 to 2022.

Career
His FIS Ski Jumping World Cup debut took place on 29 December 2009 at the Four Hills Tournament in Oberstdorf, having previously gained success in the Continental Cup. On 3 January 2010, he succeeded in Innsbruck with a 30th place-his first World Cup point. At the FIS Ski-Flying World Championships 2010 in Planica he reached the 28th place in the individual event.
In his second season, he won the third place with the German team in Oberstdorf in 2011.
At the beginning of the 2011/2012 World Cup, he finished 9th in Kuusamo. In Lillehammer on 3 December 2011 he reached the second rank, his first podium placing. A week later he won the competition on the large hill in Harrachov ahead of Thomas Morgenstern and his teammate Severin Freund. At the same jump, his father Holger Freitag celebrated his only World Cup victory on 8 January 1983. On 20 January he clinched 2nd spot in Polish Zakopane, behind home favorite Kamil Stoch, securing his 3rd individual podium of his career.

At the Winter Olympics 2018 in Pyeongchang he won together with his German team mates Karl Geiger, Stephan Leyhe, and Andreas Wellinger the silver medal in the team large hill competition.

Record

Olympic Games

World Championship

World Cup

Standings

Wins

References

External links

1991 births
Living people
German male ski jumpers
Ski jumpers at the 2014 Winter Olympics
Ski jumpers at the 2018 Winter Olympics
Olympic ski jumpers of Germany
FIS Nordic World Ski Championships medalists in ski jumping
Medalists at the 2018 Winter Olympics
Olympic silver medalists for Germany
Olympic medalists in ski jumping
Sportspeople from Saxony